In chemistry, the rate law or rate equation for a reaction is an equation that links the initial or forward reaction rate with the concentrations or pressures of the reactants and constant parameters (normally rate coefficients and partial reaction orders). For many reactions, the initial rate is given by a power law such as

where  and  express the concentration of the species  and  usually in moles per liter (molarity). These are often positive integers, but they may also be zero, fractional, or negative. The constant  is the reaction rate constant or rate coefficient of the reaction. Its value may depend on conditions such as temperature, ionic strength, surface area of an adsorbent, or light irradiation. If the reaction goes to completion, the rate equation for the reaction rate  applies throughout the course of the reaction.

Elementary (single-step) reactions and reaction steps have reaction orders equal to the stoichiometric coefficients for each reactant. The overall reaction order, i.e. the sum of stoichiometric coefficients of reactants, is always equal to the molecularity of the elementary reaction. However, complex (multi-step) reactions may or may not have reaction orders equal to their stoichiometric coefficients. This implies that the order and the rate equation of a given reaction cannot be reliably deduced from the stoichiometry and must be determined experimentally, since an unknown reaction mechanism could be either elementary or complex. When the experimental rate equation has been determined, it is often of use for deduction of the reaction mechanism.

The rate equation of a reaction with an assumed multi-step mechanism can often be derived theoretically using quasi-steady state assumptions from the underlying elementary reactions, and compared with the experimental rate equation as a test of the assumed mechanism. The equation may involve a fractional order, and may depend on the concentration of an intermediate species.

A reaction can also have an undefined reaction order with respect to a reactant if the rate is not simply proportional to some power of the concentration of that reactant; for example, one cannot talk about reaction order in the rate equation for a bimolecular reaction between adsorbed molecules:

Definition

Consider a typical chemical reaction in which two reactants A and B combine to form a product C:

This can also be written

The prefactors −1, −2 and 3 (with negative signs for reactants because they are consumed) are known as stoichiometric coefficients. One molecule of A combines with two of B to form 3 of C, so if we use the symbol [X] for the number of moles of chemical X,

If the reaction takes place in a closed system at constant temperature and volume, without a build-up of reaction intermediates, the reaction rate  is defined as

where  is the stoichiometric coefficient for chemical Xi, with a negative sign for a reactant.

The initial reaction rate  has some functional dependence on the concentrations of the reactants,

and this dependence is known as the rate equation or rate law. This law generally cannot be deduced from the chemical equation and must be determined by experiment.

Power laws
A common form for the rate equation is a power law:

The constant  is called the rate constant. The exponents, which can be fractional, are called partial orders of reaction and their sum is the overall order of reaction.

In a dilute solution, an elementary reaction (one having a single step with a single transition state) is empirically found to obey the law of mass action. This predicts that the rate depends only on the concentrations of the reactants, raised to the powers of their stoichiometric coefficients.

Determination of reaction order

Method of initial rates
The natural logarithm of the power-law rate equation is

This can be used to estimate the order of reaction of each reactant. For example, the initial rate can be measured in a series of experiments at different initial concentrations of reactant  with all other concentrations  kept constant, so that 

However, this method is not always reliable because
 measurement of the initial rate requires accurate determination of small changes in concentration in short times (compared to the reaction half-life) and is sensitive to errors, and 
 the rate equation will not be completely determined if the rate also depends on substances not present at the beginning of the reaction, such as intermediates or products.

Integral method
The tentative rate equation determined by the method of initial rates is therefore normally verified by comparing the concentrations measured over a longer time (several half-lives) with the integrated form of the rate equation; this assumes that the reaction goes to completion.

For example, the integrated rate law for a first-order reaction is

The first-order rate law is confirmed if  is in fact a linear function of time. In this case the rate constant  is equal to the slope with sign reversed.

Method of flooding

The partial order with respect to a given reactant can be evaluated by the method of flooding (or of isolation) of Ostwald. In this method, the concentration of one reactant is measured with all other reactants in large excess so that their concentration remains essentially constant. In this case

 with 

and  may be determined by the integral method.

Zero order
For zero-order reactions, the reaction rate is independent of the concentration of a reactant, so that changing its concentration has no effect on the rate of the reaction. Thus, the concentration changes linearly with time. This may occur when there is a bottleneck which limits the number of reactant molecules that can react at the same time, for example if the reaction requires contact with an enzyme or a catalytic surface.

Many enzyme-catalyzed reactions are zero order, provided that the reactant concentration is much greater than the enzyme concentration which controls the rate, so that the enzyme is saturated. For example, the biological oxidation of ethanol to acetaldehyde by the enzyme liver alcohol dehydrogenase (LADH) is zero order in ethanol.

Similarly reactions with heterogeneous catalysis can be zero order if the catalytic surface is saturated. For example, the decomposition of phosphine on a hot tungsten surface at high pressure is zero order in phosphine, which decomposes at a constant rate.

In homogeneous catalysis zero order behavior can come about from reversible inhibition. For example, ring-opening metathesis polymerization using third-generation Grubbs catalyst exhibits zero order behavior in catalyst due to the reversible inhibition that occurs between pyridine and the ruthenium center.

First order
A first order reaction depends on the concentration of only one reactant (a unimolecular reaction). Other reactants can be present, but their concentration has no effect on the rate. The rate law for a first order reaction is
 
Although not affecting the above math, the majority of first order reactions proceed via intermolecular collisions. Such collisions, which contribute the energy to the reactant, are necessarily second order. The rate of these collisions is, however, masked by the fact that the rate determining step remains the unimolecular breakdown of the energized reactant.

Examples of such reactions are:
 2N2O5 -> 4NO2 + O2 
 [CoCl(NH3)5]^2+ +  H2O -> [Co(H2O)(NH3)5]^3+  +  Cl-
 H2O2 -> H2O  + 1/2O2   

In organic chemistry, the class of SN1 (nucleophilic substitution unimolecular) reactions consists of first-order reactions. For example, in the reaction of aryldiazonium ions with nucleophiles in aqueous solution, the rate equation is  where Ar indicates an aryl group.

Second order
A reaction is said to be second order when the overall order is two. The rate of a second-order reaction may be proportional to one concentration squared,  or (more commonly) to the product of two concentrations,  As an example of the first type, the reaction  is second-order in the reactant  and zero order in the reactant CO.

For the rate proportional to a single concentration squared, the time dependence of the concentration is given by
 
The time dependence for a rate proportional to two unequal concentrations is
 
if the concentrations are equal, they satisfy the previous equation.

The second type includes nucleophilic addition-elimination reactions, such as the alkaline hydrolysis of ethyl acetate:
CH3COOC2H5 + OH- -> CH3COO- + C2H5OH

This reaction is first-order in each reactant and second-order overall: 

If the same hydrolysis reaction is catalyzed by imidazole, the rate equation becomes

The rate is first-order in one reactant (ethyl acetate), and also first-order in imidazole, which as a catalyst does not appear in the overall chemical equation.

Another well-known class of second-order reactions are the SN2 (bimolecular nucleophilic substitution) reactions, such as the reaction of n-butyl bromide with sodium iodide in acetone:

CH3CH2CH2CH2Br + NaI -> CH3CH2CH2CH2I + NaBr(v)

This same compound can be made to undergo a bimolecular (E2) elimination reaction, another common type of second-order reaction, if the sodium iodide and acetone are replaced with sodium tert-butoxide as the salt and tert-butanol as the solvent:

CH3CH2CH2CH2Br + NaO\mathit{t}-Bu -> CH3CH2CH=CH2 + NaBr + HO\mathit{t}-Bu

Pseudo-first order
If the concentration of a reactant remains constant (because it is a catalyst, or because it is in great excess with respect to the other reactants), its concentration can be included in the rate constant, leading to a pseudo–first-order (or occasionally pseudo–second-order) rate equation. For a typical second-order reaction with rate equation  if the concentration of reactant B is constant then  where the pseudo–first-order rate constant  The second-order rate equation has been reduced to a pseudo–first-order rate equation, which makes the treatment to obtain an integrated rate equation much easier.

One way to obtain a pseudo-first order reaction is to use a large excess of one reactant (say, [B]≫[A]) so that, as the reaction progresses, only a small fraction of the reactant in excess (B) is consumed, and its concentration can be considered to stay constant. For example, the hydrolysis of esters by dilute mineral acids follows pseudo-first order kinetics, where the concentration of water is constant because it is present in large excess:
 CH3COOCH3 + H2O -> CH3COOH + CH3OH

The hydrolysis of sucrose in acid solution is often cited as a first-order reaction with rate  The true rate equation is third-order,  however, the concentrations of both the catalyst  and the solvent  are normally constant, so that the reaction is pseudo–first-order.

Summary for reaction orders 0, 1, 2, and n

Elementary reaction steps with order 3 (called ternary reactions) are rare and unlikely to occur. However, overall reactions composed of several elementary steps can, of course, be of any (including non-integer) order.

The half-life of a first-order reaction is often expressed as t1/2 = 0.693/k (as ln(2)≈0.693). A typical first-order reaction has a lifetime τ = 1/k.

Fractional order
In fractional order reactions, the order is a non-integer, which often indicates a  chemical chain reaction or other complex reaction mechanism. For example, the pyrolysis of acetaldehyde into methane and carbon monoxide proceeds with an order of 1.5 with respect to acetaldehyde:  The decomposition of phosgene to carbon monoxide and chlorine has order 1 with respect to phosgene itself and order 0.5 with respect to chlorine: 

The order of a chain reaction can be rationalized using the steady state approximation for the concentration of reactive intermediates such as free radicals. For the pyrolysis of acetaldehyde, the Rice-Herzfeld mechanism  is

Initiation   CH3CHO -> .CH3 + .CHO
Propagation  .CH3 + CH3CHO -> CH3CO. + CH4
CH3CO. -> .CH3 + CO
Termination  2 .CH3 -> C2H6
where • denotes a free radical.

In the steady state, the rates of formation and destruction of methyl radicals are equal, so that

so that the concentration of methyl radical satisfies

[.CH3] \quad\propto \quad[CH3CHO]^{1/2}.

The reaction rate equals the rate of the propagation steps which form the main reaction products  and CO:

in agreement with the experimental order of 3/2.

Complex laws

Mixed order
More complex rate laws have been described as being mixed order if they approximate to the laws for more than one order at different concentrations of the chemical species involved. For example, a rate law of the form  represents concurrent first order and second order reactions (or more often concurrent pseudo-first order and second order) reactions, and can be described as mixed first and second order. For sufficiently large values of [A] such a reaction will approximate second order kinetics, but for smaller [A] the kinetics will approximate first  order (or pseudo-first order). As the reaction progresses, the reaction can change from second order to first order as reactant is consumed.

Another type of mixed-order rate law has a denominator of two or more terms, often because the identity of the rate-determining step depends on the values of the concentrations. An example is the oxidation of an alcohol to a ketone by hexacyanoferrate (III) ion [Fe(CN)63−] with ruthenate (VI) ion (RuO42−) as catalyst. For this reaction, the rate of disappearance of hexacyanoferrate (III) is  

This is zero-order with respect to hexacyanoferrate (III) at the onset of the reaction (when its concentration is high and the ruthenium catalyst is quickly regenerated), but changes to first-order when its concentration decreases and the regeneration of catalyst becomes rate-determining.

Notable mechanisms with mixed-order rate laws with two-term denominators include:
 Michaelis-Menten kinetics for enzyme-catalysis: first-order in substrate (second-order overall) at low substrate concentrations, zero order in substrate (first-order overall) at higher substrate concentrations; and
 the Lindemann mechanism for unimolecular reactions: second-order at low pressures, first-order at high pressures.

Negative order
A reaction rate can have a negative partial order with respect to a substance. For example, the conversion of ozone (O3) to oxygen follows the rate equation  in an excess of oxygen. This corresponds to second order in ozone and order (−1) with respect to oxygen.

When a partial order is negative, the overall order is usually considered as undefined.

Opposed reactions

A pair of forward and reverse reactions may occur simultaneously with comparable speeds. For example, A and B react into products P and Q and vice versa (a, b, p, and q are the stoichiometric coefficients):

 {\mathit{a}A} + {\mathit{b}B} <=> {\mathit{p}P} + {\mathit{q}Q}

The reaction rate expression for the above reactions (assuming each one is elementary) can be written as:

 

where: k1 is the rate coefficient for the reaction that consumes A and B; k−1 is the rate coefficient for the backwards reaction, which consumes P and Q and produces A and B.

The constants k1 and k−1 are related to the equilibrium coefficient for the reaction (K) by the following relationship (set v=0 in balance):

Simple example

In a simple equilibrium between two species:

  A <=> P 

where the reaction starts with an initial concentration of reactant A, [A]0, and an initial concentration of 0 for product P at time t=0.

Then the equilibrium constant K is expressed as:

 

The concentration of A at time t, is related to the concentration of P at time t, by the equilibrium reaction equation:

  [A]_\mathit{t} = [A]0 - [P]_\mathit{t} 

The term [P]0 is not present because, in this simple example, the initial concentration of P is 0.

This applies even when time t is at infinity; i.e., equilibrium has been reached:

  [A]_\mathit{e} = [A]0 - [P]_\mathit{e} 

then it follows, by the definition of K, that

 

and, therefore,

 

These equations allow us to uncouple the system of differential equations, and allow us to solve for the concentration of A alone.

The reaction equation was given previously as:

 

For  A <=> P  this is simply

 

The derivative is negative because this is the rate of the reaction going from A to P, and therefore the concentration of A is decreasing. To simplify notation, let x be , the concentration of A at time t. Let  be the concentration of A at equilibrium. Then:

 

Since:

 

the reaction rate becomes:

 

which results in:

 .

A plot of the negative natural logarithm of the concentration of A in time minus the concentration at equilibrium versus time t gives a straight line with slope k1 + k−1. By measurement of [A]e and [P]e the values of K and the two reaction rate constants will be known.

Generalization of simple example

If the concentration at the time t = 0 is different from above, the simplifications above are invalid, and a system of differential equations must be solved. However, this system can also be solved exactly to yield the following generalized expressions:

When the equilibrium constant is close to unity and the reaction rates very fast for instance in conformational analysis of molecules, other methods are required for the determination of rate constants for instance by complete lineshape analysis in NMR spectroscopy.

Consecutive reactions

For reactant A: 
For reactant B: 
For product C: 

With the individual concentrations scaled by the total population of reactants to become probabilities, linear systems of differential equations such as these can be formulated as a master equation. The differential equations can be solved analytically and the integrated rate equations are

The steady state approximation leads to very similar results in an easier way.

Parallel or competitive reactions

When a substance reacts simultaneously to give two different products, a parallel or competitive reaction is said to take place.

Two first order reactions

The integrated rate equations are then ;  and
.

One important relationship in this case is

One first order and one second order reaction

This can be the case when studying a bimolecular reaction and a simultaneous hydrolysis (which can be treated as pseudo order one) takes place: the hydrolysis complicates the study of the reaction kinetics, because some reactant is being "spent" in a parallel reaction. For example, A reacts with R to give our product C, but meanwhile the hydrolysis reaction takes away an amount of A to give B, a byproduct: A + H2O -> B  and A + R -> C .

Concentration of B is related to that of C through 

The integrated equations were analytically obtained but during the process it was assumed that . Therefore, previous equation for [C] can only be used for low concentrations of [C] compared to [A]0

Stoichiometric reaction networks
The most general description of a chemical reaction network considers a number  of distinct chemical species reacting via  reactions.
 The chemical equation of the -th reaction can then be written in the generic form

 

which is often written in the equivalent form

 

Here

  denotes the -th chemical species,
  is the rate constant of the -th reaction and

The rate of such a reaction can be inferred by the law of mass action

 

which denotes the flux of molecules per unit time and unit volume. Here [\vec{X}]=([X1], [X2], \ldots ,[X_\mathit{N}]) is the vector of concentrations. This definition includes the elementary reactions:

 zero order reactions
 first order reactions
 second order reactions

Each of these is discussed in detail below. One can define the stoichiometric matrix
 
The reaction rate equations can then be written in the general form

 

This is the product of the stoichiometric matrix and the vector of reaction rate functions.
Particular simple solutions exist in equilibrium, for systems composed of merely reversible reactions. In this case, the rate of the forward and backward reactions are equal, a principle called detailed balance. Detailed balance is a property of the stoichiometric matrix  alone and does not depend on the particular form of the rate functions . All other cases where detailed balance is violated are commonly studied by flux balance analysis, which has been developed to understand metabolic pathways.

General dynamics of unimolecular conversion

For a general unimolecular reaction involving interconversion of  different species, whose concentrations at time  are denoted by  through , an analytic form for the time-evolution of the species can be found.

Also, let  be the vector of concentrations as a function of time.

Let  be the vector of ones.

Let  be the  identity matrix.

Let  be the function that takes a vector and constructs a diagonal matrix whose on-diagonal entries are those of the vector.

Then the time-evolved state  is given by

 
thus providing the relation between the initial conditions of the system and its state at time .

See also
 Michaelis–Menten kinetics
 Molecularity
 Petersen matrix
 Reaction–diffusion system
 Reactions on surfaces: rate equations for reactions where at least one of the reactants adsorbs onto a surface
 Reaction progress kinetic analysis
 Reaction rate
 Reaction rate constant
 Steady state approximation
 Gillespie algorithm
 Balance equation
 Belousov-Zhabotinsky reaction
 Lotka–Volterra equations
 Chemical kinetics

References

Books cited

External links
  Chemical kinetics, reaction rate, and order (needs flash player)
 Reaction kinetics, examples of important rate laws (lecture with audio).
  Rates of Reaction

Chemical kinetics
Chemical reaction engineering

cy:Cyfradd adwaith#Hafaliadau cyfradd